American royalty may refer to American citizens who are members of royal families, through birth, naturalization or marriage; or American families that are given the epithet or moniker as American royalty.

Former monarchies of the United States

The territory of the United States of America was once ruled by monarchies, as such, the royalty of these territories included:

Indigenous royals
 Hawaiian monarchy, for Hawaii, conquered by the US and annexed into the Republic
 Paramount Chiefs of the Powhatan Confederacy

Colonial monarchies of territory now the United States
 British monarchy, for the 13 Colonies, prior to the American Revolution
 Dutch monarchy, for the Colony of New Netherlands (New York State / New Jersey / Connecticut / Vermont)
 Swedish monarchy, for the Swedish Delaware Chesapeake Colony
 Spanish monarchy, for Florida, California, Louisiana, Desert Southwest, Texas, Puerto Rico, Virgin Islands
 French monarchy, for Louisiana, the Great Plains, and Midwest
 Russian monarchy, for Alaska
 Japanese monarchy, for Guam

Royalty of foreign nations 
Americans may remain American and hold titles of nobility. However no American governments can bestow titles of nobility, and no one holding such title can hold down a government job.

Americans who married into royalty
 Elizabeth Patterson Bonaparte (1785–1879), morganatic consort of Jérôme Bonaparte
 Susan May Williams (1812–1881), Princess Jérôme Napoléon Bonaparte; wife of Jérôme Napoléon Bonaparte of the House of Bonaparte
 Jane Allen Campbell (1865–1938), Princess-consort of San Faustino; wife of Carlo Bourbon del Monte, Prince di San Faustino
 Mary Elsie Moore (1889–1941), Princess-consort of Civitella-Cesi; wife of Marino Torlonia, 4th Prince of Civitella-Cesi
 Wallis Simpson (1896–1986) Duchess of Windsor; who married and forced the abdication of King Edward VIII of England
 Kay Sage (1898–1963) ex-Princess-consort of San Faustino; wife of Ranieri Bourbon del Monte , Prince di San Faustino
 Barbara Hutton (1912–1979), ex-Princess-consort of Prince Igor Troubetzkoy of the Trubetskoy family, ex-Princess-consort of Prince Pierre Raymond Doan Vinh na Champassak of the Kingdom of Champasak
 Rita Hayworth (1918–1987) ex-Princess-consort of Prince Aly Khan of Nizari Ismaili Aga Khan
 Grace Kelly (1929–1982), Princess-consort of Monaco; who married into the Monégasque royal family
 Lee Radziwill (1933–2019) ex-Princess-consort of Prince Stanisław Albrecht Radziwill of the Reichfurst House of Radziwill of the Holy Roman Empire; she was the sister of Jacqueline Kennedy Onassis, née Bouiver
 Hope Cooke (born 1940) ex-Queen-consort of Sikkim
 Queen Noor Lisa Halaby (born 1951) Queen-consort of Jordan; now Dowager Queen
 Princess Angela of Liechtenstein (born 1958), Princess-consort of Prince Maximilian of Liechtenstein of the House of Liechtenstein
 Marie-Chantal, Crown Princess of Greece (born 1968), Princess-consort of Crown Prince Pavlos of Greece; she is the sister of Princess Alexandra von Fürstenberg
 Alexandra von Fürstenberg (born 1972), ex-Princess-consort of Prince Alexander von Fürstenberg of the House of Fürstenberg of the Principality of Fürstenberg-Fürstenberg; she is the sister of Crown Princess Marie-Chantal
 Ali Kay, Princess-consort of Prince Alexander von Fürstenberg of the House of Fürstenberg of the Principality of Fürstenberg-Fürstenberg
 Carole Radziwill (born 1966), Princess Carole Ann Radziwill; married Prince Anthony Radziwill, the nephew of Jacqueline Kennedy Onassis
 Princess Sarah Zeid (born 1972), Princess-consort of Prince Zeid bin Ra'ad, Crown Prince of Iraq
 Christopher O'Neill (born 1974) Prince-consort of Princess Madeleine, Duchess of Hälsingland and Gästrikland
 Kelly Rondestvedt (born 1975) Princess-consort of Hubertus, Hereditary Prince of Saxe-Coburg and Gotha, heir of the Duchy of Saxony
 Meghan Markle (born 1981), Duchess of Sussex, Consort to Prince Henry of Wales; who married into the House of Windsor
 LeOntra Breeden (born 1982), Archduchess of Austria, Consort to Archduke Franz Ferdinand von Habsburg-Lothringen
 Kendra Spears (born 1988) Princess Salwa Aga Khan consort of Prince Rahim Aga Khan of Nizari Ismaili Aga Khan
 Alana Camille Bunte (born 1990), Princess-consort of Prince Casimir zu Sayn-Wittgenstein-Sayn of Sayn-Wittgenstein-Sayn
 Ariana Austin Princess-consort of Prince Yoel of Ethiopia Joel Makonnen of the Biblical House of Solomon
Deena Aljuhani Abdulaziz (born 1975) married Saudi Prince Sultan bin Fahad bin Nasser bin Abdulaziz

Royalty who were born in America
 Prince Jerome Napoleon Bonaparte II (1830–1893), born in Baltimore, Maryland, USA: member of the House of Bonaparte
 Prince Charles Joseph Bonaparte (1851–1921), born in Baltimore, Maryland, USA; member of the House of Bonaparte
 Bhumibol Adulyadej (1927-2016) King of Thailand, born in Cambridge, Massachusetts, USA; the first monarch born in the United States.
 Catherine Oxenberg (born 1961) born in New York City, New York, USA; daughter of Princess Elizabeth of Yugoslavia
 Christina Oxenberg (born 1962) born in New York City, New York, USA; daughter of Princess Elizabeth of Yugoslavia
 Prince Alexander von Fürstenberg (born 1970) born in Malibu, California, USA; member of the German princely family of Fürstenberg.
 Princess Tatiana von Fürstenberg (born 1971) born in New York, New York, USA; member of the German princely family of Fürstenberg.
 Princess Sarah Culberson (born 1976) born in Morgantown, West Virginia, US; member of the ruling family of Bumpe in Sierra Leone.
 Peter, Hereditary Prince of Yugoslavia (born 1980) born in Chicago, Illinois, USA; member of the House of Karađorđević.
 Prince Alexander of Yugoslavia (born 1982) born in Fairfax, Virginia, USA; member of the House of Karađorđević.
 Prince Philip of Yugoslavia (born 1982) born in Fairfax, Virginia, USA; member of the House of Karađorđević.
 Princess Tatiana Galitzine (born 1984), member of the Russian princely House of Golitsyn and daughter of Archduchess Maria-Anna of Austria
 Princess Nora of Oettingen-Spielberg (born 1990) born in West Palm Beach, Florida, US; daughter of the current Prince of Oettingen-Spielberg
 India Oxenberg (born 1991) born in Malibu, California, USA; granddaughter of Princess Elizabeth of Yugoslavia
 Jazmin Grace Grimaldi (born 1992) born in Palm Springs, California, USA; illegitimate daughter of Albert II, Prince of Monaco and member of the House of Grimaldi.
 Princess Noor Pahlavi (born 1992) born in Washington D.C., USA; granddaughter of the last Shah and Empress of Iran
 Princess Maria-Olympia of Greece and Denmark (born 1996); born in New York, New York, USA; member of the Greek royal family and the House of Glücksburg.
 Prince Constantine Alexios of Greece and Denmark (born 1998); born in New York, New York, USA; member of the Greek royal family and the House of Glücksburg.
 Princess Talita von Fürstenberg (born 1999), member of the German princely family of Fürstenberg.
 Prince Achileas-Andreas of Greece and Denmark (born 2000) born in New York, New York, USA; member of the Greek royal family and the House of Glücksburg.
 Maud Elizabeth Daphne Marina Windsor (born 2013) born in Los Angeles, California, USA; granddaughter of Prince Michael of Kent and member of the House of Windsor.
 Princess Leonore, Duchess of Gotland (born 2014) born in New York, New York, USA; granddaughter of Carl XVI Gustaf of Sweden and member of the House of Bernadotte.
 Princess Lilibet of Sussex (born 2021) known as Lilibet Mountbatten-Windsor until the accession of her grandfather to the British throne, born in Santa Barbara, California, USA; daughter of Prince Harry, Duke of Sussex and Meghan Markle

Royalty who became naturalized Americans
 Prince Jérôme Napoléon Bonaparte (1805–1870), member of the House of Bonaparte
 Prince Arnold zu Windisch-Graetz (1929-2007), member of the House of Windisch-Graetz
 Diane von Fürstenberg (born 1946) ex-Princess-consort of Prince Egon von Fürstenberg of the House of Fürstenberg of the Principality of Fürstenberg-Fürstenberg
 Prince Augustine Kposowa, member of the ruling family of Bumpe in Sierra Leone

Royalty who were born abroad with dual American citizenship
 Marina Torlonia di Civitella-Cesi (1916–1960), daughter of Marino Torlonia, 4th Prince of Civitella-Cesi
 Prince Archie of Sussex (born 2019) known as Archie Mountbatten-Windsor until the accession of his grandfather to the British throne, born in London, UK; son of Prince Harry, Duke of Sussex and Meghan Markle

Politics and popular culture

Political dynasties
 Adams political family, of two Presidents, two signers of the Declaration of Independence 
 Bush family, of two Presidents, two Governors, and senators 
 Clinton family, of Bill and Hillary Rodham 
 Harrison family of Virginia, of three Presidents, a signer of the Declaration of Independence, and governors 
 Kennedy family, who created the Camelot era mid-century 
 Lee family, political family of Colonial Virginia and Maryland
 Roosevelt family, from the old stock Knickerbocker settlers 
 George Washington, Commanding General of the Continental Army, the man who would not be king 
 Family of Robert Carter I, "King Carter", wealthy planting family of Colonial Virginia

Business dynasties
 Astor family
 Carnegie family
 Du Pont family
 Getty family
 Hearst family
 Hilton family
 Lowell family
 Rockefeller family
 Walton family
 Vanderbilt family

Celebrities
 Frank Sinatra (1915-1998) the Chairman of the Board 
 Elvis Presley (1935-1977) the King (of Rock and Roll) 
Aretha Franklin (1942–2018), the Queen of Soul
 Michael Jackson (1958-2009) the King (of Pop) 
 Beyonce Knowles-Carter (born 1981) Queen Bey 
Madonna the Queen of Pop
Britney Spears the Princess of Pop
Justin Timberlake the Prince of Pop
 Tina Turner (born 1939) The Queen of Rock

See also
 List of Americans who married international nobility
 United Empire Loyalist (American royalists) those 13 Colonies Colonials who disagreed with the Declaration of Independence
 Loyalist (American Revolution), those 13 Colonies Colonials who sided with the King during the American Revolutionary War
 Canadian royalty

Notes

References

Lists of American people
United States